Nina Ukru (Quechua nina fire, ukru hole, pit, hollow, "fire hollow", Hispanicized spelling Ninaucro) is a mountain in the Paryaqaqa or Waruchiri mountain range in the Andes of Peru, about  high. It is situated in the Lima Region, Huarochirí Province, Quinti District. Nina Ukru lies southwest of Qullqip'ukru and west of Paryaqaqa.

References

Mountains of Peru
Mountains of Lima Region